The Charlotte Checkers are a minor-league professional ice hockey team based in Charlotte, North Carolina. They are members of the Atlantic Division of the Eastern Conference in the American Hockey League (AHL), and are the top minor league affiliate of the Florida Panthers of the National Hockey League (NHL). The Checkers play their home games at Bojangles' Coliseum. The current organization is the third team by this name; it succeeded a Checkers franchise that played in the ECHL from 1993 until the end of the 2009–10 ECHL season. The original Checkers team played in the city from 1956 to 1977, originally in the Eastern Hockey League and then in the Southern Hockey League. The franchise is one of six teams to replace and share a name with a predecessor franchise from a lower-tier league; the others are the Bakersfield Condors, Colorado Eagles, Ontario Reign, Rockford IceHogs, and San Diego Gulls.

History
The franchise was originally based in Troy, New York, as the Capital District Islanders from 1990 to 1993. They then became the Albany River Rats from 1993 to 2010, until the River Rats were sold to MAK Hockey, LLC, led by Charlotte beer distributor Michael Kahn, owner of the ECHL Checkers. The new ownership relocated the team to Charlotte for the 2010–11 season, renaming the franchise the "Charlotte Checkers", and relinquished the ECHL franchise to the league.

The Checkers are the second North Carolina-based team to play at the highest level of minor-league hockey, following the Carolina Monarchs, who played in Greensboro from 1995 to 1997. The Checkers inherited the River Rats' affiliation with the Carolina Hurricanes, in keeping with a recent trend to have NHL teams' top affiliates geographically close to their parent teams in order to ease movement between the AHL and the NHL.

Playing at the Time Warner Cable Arena, the Checkers' first home game on October 15, 2010, in front of 12,512 spectators which set an attendance record for a hockey game in Charlotte. On February 26, 2011, the attendance record was broken as 12,933 fans watched the Checkers defeat the Connecticut Whale 1–0. Almost a year later, on February 25, 2012, the attendance record was broken yet again as 13,102 fans watched the Checkers fall to the Oklahoma City Barons, 3–2. On April 11, 2015, the attendance record was broken a third time as 13,219 fans watched the last Checkers game at Time Warner Cable Arena, a 2–0 loss to the Rockford IceHogs.

In late 2014, the Checkers announced they would return in the following season to the Bojangles' Coliseum, the home of the previous Checkers teams until 2005. As Kahn detailed, the move would reconnect with said team legacy. Additionally, having a dedicated arena allowed for "greater control over every aspect of our business, including scheduling, amenities, game presentation and sponsorship inventory." To make sure the Coliseum was up to AHL standards, the Charlotte City Council arranged to provide $16 million to fund renovations. While Time Warner Cable Arena had been one of the largest arenas in the AHL, it left much to be desired as a hockey venue. It seated 14,100 people, but over 4,000 seats had obstructed views.

In Charlotte on May 9 and 10, 2018, in game four of the second round of the Calder Cup playoffs, the Checkers and the Lehigh Valley Phantoms played the longest game in the history of the American Hockey League. A 1–1 tie was broken by a Phantoms' goal at 6:48 of the fifth overtime period, more than six hours after the game began. The Checkers made 95 shots against Lehigh Valley goalie Alex Lyon.

The 2018–19 season was the Checkers' best season as an AHL team to date and one of the best in Charlotte's hockey history. They won their first division title with 110 points and the Macgregor Kilpatrick Trophy for the league's best regular season record. It was the first time a Charlotte hockey team had broken the 100-point barrier since the SHL Checkers earned 101 points in 1974–75. They defeated the defending champion Toronto Marlies in the Eastern Conference finals to advance to their first Calder Cup final. They defeated the Chicago Wolves in five games to win their first AHL title, and the seventh hockey championship by a Charlotte-based team.

The following 2019–20 season was curtailed by the COVID-19 pandemic and the Calder Cup was not awarded. Following the cancelled postseason, the Hurricanes ended their affiliation with the Checkers after ten seasons, resulting in the Checkers affiliating with the Florida Panthers beginning with the 2020–21 season. However, due to the ongoing restrictions during the pandemic, the Checkers were one of three teams that opted out of the 2020–21 AHL season. When the Checkers returned for the 2021–22 season, they remained the primary affiliate of the Panthers, but agreed to also serve as the affiliate for the 2021–22 expansion team Seattle Kraken. The Kraken's general manager Ron Francis formerly worked for the Hurricanes when the team was still affiliated with the Checkers.

Season-by-season results

Players

Current roster
Updated March 20, 2023.

Team captains

Bryan Rodney, 2010–11
Brett Sutter, 2011–14
Michal Jordan, 2014–15
Derek Ryan, 2015–16
Patrick Brown, 2016–19
Roland McKeown, 2019–20
Zac Dalpe, 2021–present

References

External links
 

 
Ice hockey clubs established in 2010
Carolina Hurricanes minor league affiliates
Florida Panthers minor league affiliates
Seattle Kraken minor league affiliates
Ice hockey teams in North Carolina